Mionochroma subaurosum is a species of beetle in the family Cerambycidae. It was described by Zajciw in 1966. It is known from Peru, Bolivia, and Brazil.

References

Cerambycinae
Beetles described in 1966